Lastourville Airport  is an airport serving the city of Lastourville in the Ogooué-Lolo Province of Gabon.

See also

 List of airports in Gabon
 Transport in Gabon

References

External links
Lastourville Airport
OpenStreetMap - Lastourville
OurAirports - Lastourville
HERE/Nokia - Lastourville
SkyVector Aeronautical Charts

Airports in Gabon